William Stolte Jr. House is a historic late 19th-century house in Reedsburg, Wisconsin, United States. It was added to the National Register of Historic Places in 1984. It is in the Queen Anne and Gothic architecture styles, and is located at 432 S. Walnut St next to William Stolte Sr. House.

References

Houses in Sauk County, Wisconsin
Houses on the National Register of Historic Places in Wisconsin
Queen Anne architecture in Wisconsin
Gothic Revival architecture in Wisconsin
National Register of Historic Places in Sauk County, Wisconsin
Reedsburg, Wisconsin